Inna Eftimova (born June 19, 1988 in Kostinbrod) is a track and field sprint athlete who competes internationally for Bulgaria.

Eftimova represented Bulgaria at the 2008 Summer Olympics in Beijing. She competed at the 100 metres sprint and placed 4th in her heat without advancing to the second round. She ran the distance in a time of 11.67 seconds.

In May 2012, the Bulgarian athletics federation announced a two-year ban for Eftimova after testing positive for somatotropin at the World Championships held in August 2011 in Daegu, South Korea. As a consequence of the ban she missed the 2012 London Olympics.

In 2019, she competed in the women's 100 metres event at the 2019 World Athletics Championships held in Doha, Qatar. She did not qualify to compete in the semi-finals.

References

External links
 

1988 births
Living people
Bulgarian female sprinters
Bulgarian sportspeople in doping cases
Olympic athletes of Bulgaria
Athletes (track and field) at the 2008 Summer Olympics
Doping cases in athletics
Sportspeople from Sofia Province
World Athletics Championships athletes for Bulgaria
European Games competitors for Bulgaria
Athletes (track and field) at the 2019 European Games
Athletes (track and field) at the 2020 Summer Olympics
Olympic female sprinters
20th-century Bulgarian women
21st-century Bulgarian women